Justice P. Chandra Reddy or Palagani Chandra Reddy (1 July 1904 – 7 October 1976) was an Indian judge. He was educated at V.R. High School, Nellore and Pachaiyappa’s College in Madras. He was appointed an advocate at the Madras High Court on 13 August 1928. He had practised civil and criminal cases. He was appointed an additional judge at the same court on 16 July 1949. He was appointed a permanent judge at Andhra State High Court on its formation from 5 July 1954, and later became the acting Chief Justice of the court. He was appointed the permanent Chief Justice of Andhra High Court on 16 June 1958.

He was the acting Governor of Andhra Pradesh from 20 December 1963 to 19 December 1964. He was appointed the Chief Justice of Madras High Court on 23 December 1964. He was the acting Governor of Tamil Nadu between 24 December 1964 and 7 February 1965. He retired on 7 January 1966. He died on 7 October 1976.

References

Chandra P., Reddy
Judges of the Andhra Pradesh High Court
1976 deaths
1904 births
People from Tamil Nadu
Chief Justices of the Madras High Court
Chief Justices of the Andhra Pradesh High Court
20th-century Indian judges
Gandhians
Telugu people